João  Alves may refer to:
João Alves (bishop) (1925–2013), Portuguese Catholic bishop
João Alves Filho (born 1941), Brazilian politician
João Alves (footballer, born 1952), known as "Luvas Pretas" (black gloves), Portuguese footballer who played as a midfielder
João Alves (footballer, born 1980), Portuguese footballer who played as a midfielder